The 2019–20 Vermont Catamounts men's basketball team represented the University of Vermont in the 2019–20 NCAA Division I men's basketball season. They played their home games at the Patrick Gym in Burlington, Vermont and were led by ninth-year head coach John Becker. They finished the season 26–7, 14–2 in America East play to win the reagular season conference championship. They defeated Maine and UMBC to advance to the championship game of the America East tournament. However, the championship game, along with all other postseason tournaments, were cancelled amid the COVID-19 pandemic.

Previous season
The Catamounts finished the 2018–19 season 27–7, 14–2 in conference play to finish in first place. In the America East tournament, they defeated Maine in the quarterfinals, Binghamton in the semifinals, where they advanced to the championship game against UMBC, in which they won, giving them the conference's automatic bid to the NCAA tournament. As the No. 13 seed in the West region, they lost to No. 4 Florida State 76–69.

Roster

Schedule and results

|-
!colspan=12 style=| Exhibition

|-
!colspan=12 style=| Non-conference regular season

|-
!colspan=9 style=| America East Conference regular season

|-
!colspan=12 style=| America East tournament
|-

|-

Source

References

Vermont Catamounts men's basketball seasons
Vermont Catamounts
Vermont Catamounts men's basketball
Vermont Catamounts men's basketball